True Colors or True Colours may refer to:

Music

Cyndi Lauper 
 True Colors (Cyndi Lauper album), 1986
 "True Colors" (Cyndi Lauper song), the title track
 True Colors World Tour, a concert tour by her
 True Colors (concert tour), an annual music event created by her

Zedd 
 True Colors (Zedd album), 2015
 "True Colors" (Zedd and Kesha song), 2015
 True Colors Tour, a concert tour by him

Other artists 
 True Colors, 2019 EP by Alba

Albums 
 True Colours (High Contrast album)
 True Colours (Level 42 album), 1984
 True Colours (Split Enz album)
 True Colours, a 2005 album by Smujji
 True Colors: The Best of Sonic the Hedgehog Part 2, a compilation album of songs from the Sonic the Hedgehog franchise

Songs 
 "True Colours" (Go West song), 1986
"True Colours", by Studio Killers from Studio Killers
"True Colors", by The Weeknd from Starboy

Film and television

Film
True Colors (film), a 1991 film directed by Herbert Ross

TV series
True Colors (TV series), a 1990–92 American television series 
True Colours (Australian TV series), a 2022 Australian television series

Episodes of TV series
"True Colours" (D:TNG episode), an episode from season 6 of Degrassi: The Next Generation
"True Colors" (AoSMB3 episode), an episode of The Adventures of Super Mario Bros. 3
"True Colors" (That's So Raven), an episode from season 3 of That's So Raven
"True Colors", episode 6 of Scorpion (2014-5)
"True Colors" (Grey's Anatomy), an episode from season 13 of Grey's Anatomy
"True Colors" (The Flash), an episode from season 4 of The Flash
"True Colors" (Amphibia), an episode from season 2 of Amphibia

Fiction 
 Star Wars Republic Commando: True Colors, the third novel in the Republic Commando series
 TrueColors, a series of novels by Melody Carlson
 True Colours, a 2013 crime novel by Stephen Leather

Other uses 
 True Colors (personality), the psychometric personality test
 Life Is Strange: True Colors, video game in the Life Is Strange series

See also 
 True color (disambiguation)